Etar is a Bulgarian sports football club based in Veliko Tarnovo, that plays in the Second League, the second level of Bulgarian football.

Etar is the official successor of Etar 1924, which was dissolved for financial reasons after the 2012–13 season. The current Etar was established after the former folded and quickly ascended from the amateur leagues, eventually promoting to the Bulgarian First League at the end of the 2016–17 season. The club's home ground has been Ivaylo Stadium since 2013. Etar plays in all-violet kits and their nickname is 'The Bolyars'.

History

Foundation and Amateur League (2013–2016)
The club was founded as OFC Etar Veliko Tarnovo in 2013 with the license of FC Botev Debelets. In their first season they finished in 5th position in V Group.

In January 2016, Boncho Genchev became the new manager of the team which was in 3rd place at the halfway point in the season, only two points behind the 1st place team. The selection included Lyubomir Genchev coming from A Group team Montana, Stefan Hristov from Spartak Pleven and the leading goalscorer in  the first part of 2015–16 season in B Group, Petar Dimitrov. The team eventually won all its matches, winning the league and being promoted to B Group.

Professional Football (2016–present)
On 9 June 2016 Etar were officially approved for the new 2nd division — Second League, with the club changing its abbreviation to "SFC Etar". Ferario Spasov remains in his position as manager and with a good selection team made promotion to First League. Etar were promoted as champions of the 2016–17 Second League, sealing their title on the final day of the season with a 2–2 away draw against Nesebar, coupled with Septemvri Sofia's 2–0 away defeat to Oborishte.

Etar's first season into the elite was difficult. The team finished 13th in the regular phase, with only four wins. This placed Etar as one of the candidates for relegation. In the relegation phase, Etar finished last in their group and had to play playoff/play out matches in order to remain in the elite. In the first round, Etar beat Pirin Blagoevgrad 3-1 aggregate and advanced to the second round. There, the violets faced Dunav Ruse. Two strong matches resulted in a 4-1 aggregate win, and Etar secured their status as a member of the top tier. 

On 4 January 2018 Krasimir Balakov was announced as the new manager in the club with Stanislav Genchev, Iliyan Kiryakov and Kaloyan Chakarov as first team coaches.

After 4 seasons in the First League, Etar was relegated to the Second League at the end of the 2020-21 season.

League positions

Nickname, shirt and colors
Their main nicknames are the Bolyars and the Violets, the latter in reference to the colour of their home kit, which is often mistaken for purple.

Honours

Domestic
First League:
  Winners (1): 1990–91
Second League:
  Winners (1): 2016–17
Third League:
  Winners (1): 2015–16
  Runners–up (1): 2014–15
Bulgarian Cup:
 Semifinals (4): 1959-60, 1989-90, 1990-91, 1992-93

Players

Current squad
 

For recent transfers, see Transfers summer 2022 and Transfers winter 2022–23.

Foreign players
Up to five non-EU nationals can be registered and given a squad number for the first team in the Bulgarian First Professional League however only three can be used in a match day. Those non-EU nationals with European ancestry can claim citizenship from the nation their ancestors came from. If a player does not have European ancestry he can claim Bulgarian citizenship after playing in Bulgaria for 5 years. 

EU Nationals

EU Nationals (Dual citizenship)
  Alejandro Goncalves

Non-EU Nationals
 Martín Morán
 Javier Betegón

Etar II

Etar II is a Bulgarian football team based in Veliko Tarnovo. It is the reserve team of Etar Veliko Tarnovo, and currently plays in Third League, the third level of Bulgarian football.

Current squad

Notable players
 
The footballers enlisted below have international caps for their respective countries or more than 100 caps for Etar. Players whose name is listed in bold represented their countries.
 

 

 
Bulgaria
 Ivan Petkov
 Stanislav Genchev
 Ivan Stoyanov
 Ventsislav Vasilev
 Georgi Sarmov
 Hristo Ivanov
 Georgi Pashov
 Daniel Mladenov
 Ivaylo Dimitrov
 Ivan Ivanov

 
Europe
 Artjom Artjunin

Central America
 Romeesh Ivey

 
Africa
 Alioune Badará
 Alasana Manneh
 Gaëtan Missi Mezu

Goalscoring and appearance records

Players in bold are still playing for Etar.

Past seasons

Seasons in First League: 4
Seasons in Second League: 2
Seasons in V Group (now Third League''): 3

Managers

Club officials

Board of directors

Current technical body

References

External links 
 
bgclubs.eu

Association football clubs established in 2013
2013 establishments in Bulgaria
Football clubs in Veliko Tarnovo
Phoenix clubs (association football)